Enneanectes smithi is a species of triplefin blenny. It was described by Hugh Roger Lubbock and Alasdair James Edwards in 1981 from St Paul's Rocks in the western Atlantic Ocean. The specific name honours Roger Wellesley Smith for his assistance to the Cambridge University expedition to St Paul's Rocks but no other information is given about this individual.

References

smithi
Taxa named by Roger Lubbock
Taxa named by Alasdair James Edwards
Fish described in 1981